Louis Alphonse de Bourbon (born 25 April 1974) is the head of the House of Bourbon. Members of the family formerly ruled France and other countries. According to the Legitimists, Louis Alphonse is considered the pretender to the defunct throne of France as Louis XX. With the death of his father, he has been using the title of Duke of Anjou since 1989.

Louis Alphonse considers himself the senior heir of Hugh Capet, King of the Franks (reigned 987–996). His claim to the defunct French throne is based on his descent from Louis XIV (r. 1643–1715) through his grandson Philip V of Spain. Philip renounced his claim to the French throne under the Treaty of Utrecht in 1713. The rival Orleanist pretenders argue that this, as well as being born a Spanish citizen, makes Louis Alphonse ineligible for the throne. They also question whether he truly is the heir-male of Louis XIV, given the rumors of illegitimacy surrounding Alfonso XII (his great-great-grandfather).

Louis Alphonse is patrilineally the senior great-grandson of Alfonso XIII, King of Spain. However, his grandfather Infante Jaime, Duke of Segovia, renounced his rights to the Spanish throne for himself and his descendants owing to his deafness (a renunciation disputed by legitimists). The crown of Spain has descended to his second cousin, King Felipe VI of Spain. Through his mother, he is also a great-grandson of Spain's caudillo (dictator) General Francisco Franco; and through his father, a great-great-great-grandson of Queen Victoria of the United Kingdom.

Early life

Birth

Louis Alphonse was born in Madrid, the second son of Alfonso de Borbón, Duke of Anjou and Cádiz, and of his wife María del Carmen Martínez-Bordiú y Franco, eldest granddaughter of Francisco Franco. Alfonso was at that time the dauphin (using "Duke of Bourbon" as title of pretence) according to those who supported the claim of his father, Infante Jaime, Duke of Segovia to the French throne. On 20 March 1975, Jaime died, and Alfonso then asserted his claim to be Head of the House of Bourbon and Legitimist claimant to the throne of France. As such, he took the title "Duke of Anjou".

Childhood
Louis Alphonse's parents separated in 1982, and their Catholic marriage was annulled in 1986. His mother has since remarried civilly twice; he had two stepsisters Mathilda (deceased) and Marella, and a stepbrother Frederick, all born before his mother's marriage to Jean-Marie Rossi and a half-sister, Cynthia Rossi, born afterwards. On 7 February 1984, Louis Alphonse's older brother Francisco died as the result of a car crash in which Louis Alphonse was also injured, although less so than their father, who was driving the automobile. From that date Louis Alphonse was recognised as the heir apparent to his father by the Legitimists. As such, he was given the additional title Duke of Bourbon on 27 September 1984 by his father. In 1987, the Spanish government declared that titles traditionally attached to the dynasty (such as the Dukedom of Cádiz) would henceforth be borne by its members on a lifetime only basis, forestalling Louis Alphonse from inheriting that grandeeship.

Education
Louis Alphonse took his primary studies at College Molière, a bilingual school, where he earned his baccalaureate. In 1991, he was admitted to CUNEF University, where he earned a master's degree in international finance. Louis is multilingual, speaking English, Spanish, and French (in addition to some Italian and German).

Succession
On 30 January 1989, his father died in a skiing accident near Vail, Colorado. Later, in 1994 Louis Alphonse received 150 million pesetas from a lawsuit against Vail Associated, which owned the ski resort where the accident occurred. Louis Alphonse was recognised by some members of the Capetian dynasty as Chef de la Maison de Bourbon (Head of the House of Bourbon) and took the title Duke of Anjou, but not his father's Spanish dukedom. He is considered the rightful pretender to the defunct French throne by adherents of the Legitimist movement.

Louis Alphonse was elected by the French Society of the Cincinnati as the representative of Louis XVI.

In addition to his Spanish citizenship, Louis Alphonse acquired French nationality through his paternal grandmother, Emmanuelle de Dampierre, also a French citizen. He attended the Lycée Français de Madrid, obtaining his COU in June 1992. He studied economics at the IESE Business School. He worked several years for BNP Paribas, a French bank in Madrid.

In 2017, Louis Alphonse stated that he wishes for the remains of his ancestors, including King Charles X, to remain at the Kostanjevica Monastery, after a movement reportedly began to have the King's remains moved to be buried along with other French monarchs in Basilica of St Denis.

In 2021, Louis Alphonse attended the wedding of Grand Duke George Mikhailovich of Russia.

Politics

Louis Alphonse describes himself as a monarchist, “but not anti-republican”. He argues for a constitutional monarchy, with a king who acts as moral authority, foreign ambassador, unifying figure, and reminder of a nation's history. He holds ties to the conservative Spanish political party Vox and is a close friend of its leader, Santiago Abascal.

He has spoken out against same-sex marriage, same-sex adoption, and abortion.

In March 2018, Louis Alphonse was named honorary president of the Francisco Franco National Foundation, a position held by his grandmother, Carmen Franco, 1st Duchess of Franco, until her death in December 2017. On July 15, later that year, he headed a Movement-for-Spain demonstration at the Valley of the Fallen monument, leading supporters of the late Spanish dictator, his great-grandfather Francisco Franco. They opposed the Spanish socialist government's plan to remove Franco's remains from a basilica near Madrid. He also launched a change.org petition, calling for the resignation of the Socialist Prime Minister Pedro Sánchez.

In 2019, he expressed public support for the Yellow vests movement in France, and later spoke at the World Congress of Families XIII, where he called for return to "Christian society".

Marriage and issue
Louis Alphonse's engagement to marry Venezuelan María Margarita Vargas Santaella, the daughter of the businessman Victor Vargas, was announced in November 2003. They were married civilly in Caracas on 5 November 2004 and religiously on 6 November 2004 in La Romana, Dominican Republic. None of the members of the Spanish royal family attended the wedding. Although no official reason was given, it was no secret that the then king of Spain, Juan Carlos I, did not approve his cousin's claim to the French throne, nor the fact that Louis Alphonse issued the wedding invitations styled as "Duke of Anjou".

Louis Alphonse and María Margarita had their first child, Eugénie, on 5 March 2007, at Mount Sinai Medical Center, Miami. She was baptised at the papal nunciature in Paris in June 2007. Her godparents are Prince Charles-Emmanuel of Bourbon-Parma and his wife Constance. French Legitimists recognize her as Eugénie, Madame Royale, the  style commonly attributed to the eldest unmarried daughter of a king of France (in Spain her name is Eugenia de Borbón Vargas).

The couple had twin sons, Louis and Alphonse, on 28 May 2010 in New York City. Their father has conferred upon them the historic French titles of, respectively, Duke of Burgundy (duc de Bourgogne), and Duke of Berry (duc de Berry). (In Spain, the twins are Don Luis and Don Alfonso de Borbón Vargas).

Their fourth child, Henri, was born on 1 February 2019 in New York and was granted the title Duke of Touraine (duc de Touraine) by his father.

Ancestry

References

Bibliography
 Thierry Ardisson. Louis XX. Contre-enquête sur la monarchie., Olivier Orban, 1986, 
 Jean Foyer, Titre et armes du prince Louis de Bourbon, Diffusion-Université-Culture, 1990.
 Apezarena, José. Luis Alfonso de Borbón: Un príncipe a la espera, Random House Mondadori, 2007, .
 Cassani Pironti, Fabio. "Bref crayon généalogique de S.A.R. la Princesse Marie-Marguerite, Duchesse d'Anjou, née Vargas Santaella", Le Lien Légitimiste, n. 16, 2007.
 Opfell, Olga S. H.R.H. Louis-Alphonse, Prince of Bourbon, Duke of Anjou: Royal House of France (House of Bourbon), Royalty Who Wait: The 21 Heads of Formerly Regnant Houses of Europe. Jefferson: McFarland & Company, Inc., Publishers, 2001. 11–32.

External links
Website of Louis de bourbon, Duke of Anjou

1974 births
Living people
House of Bourbon (Spain)
Bailiffs Grand Cross of Honour and Devotion of the Sovereign Military Order of Malta
Nobility from Madrid
Princes of France (Bourbon)
Dukes of Touraine
Dukes of Bourbon
Dukes of Anjou
Legitimist pretenders to the French throne
BNP Paribas
20th-century Roman Catholics
21st-century Roman Catholics
Francoists
Navarrese titular monarchs
Child pretenders